Giovanni Davide Maderna (Milan, 1973) is an Italian film director.

Life and work
In 1995 Maderna directed his first short film, La Place, in Lyon, France, equal winner at Nanni Moretti's Sacher Festival. After a few other shorts, and after attending for a few months the Centro Sperimentale di Cinematografia in Rome, in 1999 his first feature film This is the garden (Questo è il giardino) won the Leone del futuro - Premio Venezia opera prima "Luigi De Laurentiis" award for Best Debut Film at Venice Film Festival. Then he directed Imperfect Love (L'amore imperfetto, 2001) which also premiered at Venice Film Festival.

His third film Schopenhauer (2006) was in competition at Locarno Film Festival and screened at Lincoln Center in New York in 2007. Four years later Heaven without Earth (Cielo senza terra 2010), co-directed with Sara Pozzoli, premiered in Competition at Venice Days (Giornate degli Autori). The film has been broadcast by Rai Tre cult programme Fuori Orario over the opening night and was then nominated at Doc.it Awards.

Since 2002 he's been teaching filmmaking in various universities and cinema schools such as Università Cattolica del Sacro Cuore in Milan (Italy), SUPSI (University of Applied Sciences and Arts of Southern Switzerland) in Lugano (CH), Civica Scuola di Cinema in Milan (Italy).

He founded the production company Quarto Film and since 2007 worked with authors such as Francesco Gatti, Dario Buccino, Filippo Ticozzi, Sara Pozzoli, Mauro Santini, Tonino De Bernardi, Giovanni Cioni, Michelangelo Frammartino and Louis Benassi.

In 2005 he dedicated a video-interview (conducted with Antonio Moresco) to the Italian experimental film-maker Alberto Grifi.

In 2012 he curated the independent section at Venice Film Festival "Cinema Corsaro", a selection of works marked by an unconventional and experimental approach to both production and direction. In this occasion, he presented his new film Carmela, saved by Buccaneers, co-directed with Mauro Santini and part of a series of experimental films loosely based on Emilio Salgari's "Jolanda, la figlia del Corsaro Nero".

Look Love Lost (2012)  is a film made with private footage recorded over a few years and edited in a single session on Christmas Day 2011. Cristina Piccino on Italian newspaper Il manifesto named it the 2nd best film worldwide of 2012.

In 2015 he founded the London-based production company El Entertainment Ltd, named after Luis Buñuel's "Él".

In 2018 he starts a collaboration with experimental filmmaker and artist Louis Benassi. Their first joint work is the 16mm diptych The title is pretentious.. considering the purity of the endeavour, released in 2019.

In September 2020 he films in Rome The Walk, based on Robert Walser's legendary novella and produced by El Entertainment and Emu Films. The film stars Lino Musella as Robert/Roberto, cinematography is by Robbie Ryan. It has been awarded the Gabbiano Prize at Bellaria Film Festival in 2022.

Filmography
La Place (1995, Short)
Jahilia (Occidente) (1996, Short)
Com'è bella la città (1997, Documentary, Short) 
Dolce Stil Novo (1998, Short)
Questo è il giardino (1999)
L'amore imperfetto (2001)
Bologna, 16-2-05, Giovanni Maderna and Antonio Moresco meet Alberto Grifi  (2005, Documentary, Short)
Schopenhauer (2006)
Cielo senza terra (2010) (Co-directed with Sara Pozzoli)
Carmela, salvata dai filibustieri (2012) (Co-directed with Mauro Santini)
Look Love Lost (2012)
The Walk (2021)

References

1973 births
Living people
Italian film directors